MV Kowloon Bridge was a  ore-bulk-oil combination carrier built by Swan Hunter in 1973. She sank off the coast of the Republic of Ireland in December 1986.

History
The MV Kowloon Bridge was built on the River Tees by Swan Hunter for the Bibby Line and originally named English Bridge. In 1977, the vessel was renamed Worcestershire, as the fourth vessel to carry that name in the Bibby Line fleet. In 1979, the vessel was sold to Amroth Investments and renamed Sunshine.

The vessel was renamed a further three times, before then becoming known as Kowloon Bridge. The vessel's last voyage was between Sept-Îles, Quebec, Canada, headed for the River Clyde with a cargo of iron ore and oil.

On 20 November 1986, she anchored in Bantry Bay, Republic of Ireland after developing deck cracking in one of her frames during her Atlantic crossing. She was forced to leave port after losing her anchor and damaging her steering gear to avoid colliding with an oil tanker also anchored in Bantry Bay. Royal Air Force helicopters rescued the crew and the Kowloon Bridge was effectively abandoned with her engine running astern, heading away from the Irish coast. A tugboat that tried to reach her had to abandon the salvage attempt after she too sustained storm damage. The wind turned her around and she headed back towards the coast, nearly entering Baltimore Bay when her propeller hit the rocks, stalling the engine. Within hours, Kowloon Bridge drifted east and ran aground on a submerged reef near The Stags rocks off West Cork in the Republic of Ireland. The resulting fuel spill spread out over the Irish coastline causing extensive damage to local wildlife, and financial losses for the local fishing fleet. In the spring of 1987, Kowloon Bridge split into three sections and sank.

See also

References

External links

 
 
 Center for Tankship Excellence 

Shipwrecks in the Celtic Sea
County Cork
Maritime incidents in 1986
1986 in Ireland
1972 ships
Ships built by Swan Hunter
Engineering failures
Ore-bulk-oil carriers